Rosetta Sherwood Hall (September 19, 1865 – April 5, 1951) was a medical missionary and educator. She founded the Pyongyang School for the Deaf and Blind. Dr. Hall spent forty-four years in Korea, helping develop educational resources for disabled Koreans and implementing women's medical training.

Early life and education 
Rosetta Sherwood was born in Liberty, New York, the eldest child of English immigrants, Phoebe (née Gildersleeve) and Rosevelt Rensler Sherwood. She graduated from Oswego State Normal School in 1883 and worked as a local school teacher. After attending an 1886 visiting-lecture about the need for medical missions in India, she enrolled in the Women's Medical College of Pennsylvania. She graduated with her medical degree by 1889.

Career 
While working in lower Manhattan at Madison Street Mission Dispensary, she met her Canadian-born husband Dr. William James Hall. Dr. William Hall also was working at the same dispensary and was listed to leave on a medical mission to China with the Methodist Episcopal Church of Canada, which inspired her to apply for a similar position. She was officially called by the Women's Foreign Missionary Society of the Methodist Episcopal Church in 1890. Her future spouse received his call in 1891. They did not marry, however, until they "met in the foreign field" as they were each separately placed by separate mission boards. They married in June 1892. She lost her U.S. citizenship when she married a Canadian.

She founded the Baldwin Dispensary in Seoul (renamed the Lilian Harris Memorial Hospital). In 1894, she initiated the teaching of sight-impaired people in Korea by teaching a blind girl, using a modification of Braille that she had developed. In 1899 she established the Edith Margaret Memorial Wing of the Womens Dispensary (Pyongyang).  In 1909, she established a school for people with hearing impairments. Along with two Korean doctors (Dr. Taik Won Kim and his wife, Dr. Chung-Hee Kil), she founded the Chosun Women's Medical Training Institute in 1928, with the goal of eventually elevating it to a Women's Medical School. After Hall’s retirement, Dr. Taik Won Kim and Dr. Chung-Hee Kil took charge of the Women’s Medical Training Institute from 1933 to 1937.  This institute became Kyungsung Women's Medical School in 1938 thanks to the financial contribution of Kim Jong Ick. It became co-educational school in 1957. Currently, it has developed into one of the leading medical schools in Korea, Korea University College of Medicine. Hall was also responsible for getting or helping get other institutions of higher learning established. In 1933 she left Korea. She died on April 5, 1951 in Ocean Grove, New Jersey, and was buried with her family at the Yanghwajin Foreign Missionary Cemeteryin Yanghwajin, Seoul.

References

Bibliography 

 Hall, Rosetta S. (1906) "The Clocke class for blind girls," Korea Mission Field 2 (No.9, July) 175-76.
 Hall, Rosetta Sherwood, ed. (1897) Life of Rev. William James Hall: Medical Missionary to the Slums of New York, Pioneer Missionary to Pyong Yang, Korea; Introduction by Willard F. Mallalieu. 

1865 births
1951 deaths
Canadian educators
Canadian Protestant missionaries
Protestant missionaries in Korea
Female Christian missionaries
Christian medical missionaries
Former United States citizens
Canadian expatriates in Korea
Canadian people of American descent
Woman's Medical College of Pennsylvania alumni
People from Liberty, New York